Blake M. Bell (born August 7, 1991) is an American football tight end for the Kansas City Chiefs of the National Football League (NFL). He was selected by the San Francisco 49ers in the fourth round of the 2015 NFL Draft. He played college football at Oklahoma, where he received the nickname Belldozer, a play on words due to his large frame and running style.

Early years
Bell attended Bishop Carroll Catholic High School in Wichita, Kansas, where he played as a quarterback. As a senior in 2009, he threw for 2,752 yards with 32 touchdowns. He was ranked as the sixth best pro-style quarterback recruit by Rivals.com.

He was selected by the Detroit Tigers in the 43rd round of the 2010 Major League Baseball Draft, but did not sign with the team.

College career
Bell accepted a football scholarship from the University of Oklahoma and was redshirted in 2010. In 2011, he was the backup quarterback to Landry Jones, but appeared in the Sooners jumbo package, leading to 44 rushing attempts for 171 yards and 13 touchdowns. As a passer, he completed one of four passes for eight yards and an interception. He was the MVP of the 2011 Insight Bowl after rushing for 51 yards on 10 carries with three touchdowns.

As a sophomore in 2012, he was again the backup to Jones and was used mostly in the jumbo package. He rushed for 201 yards on 60 attempts with 11 touchdowns and completed 9-of-16 passes for 107 yards.

As a junior in 2013, he appeared in 11 games out of 13 games (8 starts), missing the contest at Kansas State University and the 2014 Sugar Bowl. He made 140 completions out of 233 attempts for 1,648 yards, 12 touchdowns and 5 interceptions.

As a senior in the spring of 2014, Bell was converted into a tight end after the emergence of redshirt freshman quarterback Trevor Knight in the 2014 Sugar Bowl. He appeared in 9 games and was used mostly for blocking purposes, posting 16 receptions for 214 yards and 4 touchdowns.

Professional career
On December 19, 2015, it was announced that Oklahoma's Blake Bell, Adam Shead, and Aaron Ripkowski had all accepted their invitations to play in the 2015 East–West Shrine Game. He raised his draft stock after being impressive during Shrine Game practices. On January 17, 2015, Bell played in the East–West Shrine Game and was a part of Jim Zorn's West team that was routed by the East 19-3.

Bell was one of 19 collegiate tight ends to attend the NFL Scouting Combine in Indianapolis, Indiana. He had an up-and-down performance at the combine, finishing last among tight ends in the bench press and fifth among tight ends in the 40-yard dash, broad jump, and vertical jump. His best performance was in the short shuttle and long shuttle where he finished second among his position group.

On March 11, 2015, Bell opted to participate at Oklahoma's pro day, but stood on his combine number and only performed positional drills for scouts and team representatives from all 32 NFL teams. Due to limited experience and a thin draft class at tight end, multiple NFL draft experts and analysts projected Bell to be a fifth round draft pick. He was ranked the ninth best tight end prospect in the draft by NFLDraftScout.com.

San Francisco 49ers

2015
Bell was selected by the San Francisco 49ers in the fourth round (117th overall) of the 2015 NFL Draft. He was the fifth tight end chosen in 2015.  On May 11, 2015, the 49ers signed him to a four-year, $2.78 million contract that includes a signing bonus of $505,132.

Throughout training camp, Bell faced stiff competition for a roster spot against Vance McDonald, Garrett Celek, Xavier Grimble, Derek Carrier, Asante Cleveland, and Rory Anderson. Head coach Jim Tomsula named him the fourth tight end on the depth chart to begin his rookie season, behind Vernon Davis, Vance McDonald, and Garrett Celek.

He made his professional regular season debut in the San Francisco 49ers' season-opening 20-3 victory over the Minnesota Vikings. The following week, he made his first career reception off a four-yard pass by quarterback Colin Kaepernick during the third quarter of a 43-18 loss to the Pittsburgh Steelers.

On October 11, 2015, he earned his first career start after Vernon Davis was inactive due to a knee injury. Bell finished the 30-27 loss at the New York Giants with one reception for six yards. He was a healthy scratch in Weeks 7-8. On November 29, 2015, Bell caught three passes for a season-high 67 yards during a 19-13 loss to the Arizona Cardinals. He saw increased snaps in the Cardinals game after Garrett Celek left the game due to an ankle injury.

The next week, he had a season-high four receptions for 43 yards during a 24-14 loss to the Cincinnati Bengals. He finished his only season under offensive coordinator Geep Chryst with a total of 15 receptions for 186 receiving yards.

2016
Bell competed to maintain a roster spot under new head coach Chip Kelly, competing against Garrett Celek, Bruce Miller, Rory Anderson, and Je'Ron Hamm. He was named the second tight end on the 49ers' depth chart behind Vance McDonald.

On December 18, 2016, Bell caught one reception for a season-high 45 yards during a 41-13 loss at the Atlanta Falcons. Unfortunately, he left the first half of the game after suffering a shoulder injury and was placed on injured reserve the following day. He finished the  season with only four receptions for 85 receiving yards in 13 games.

2017
Bell contended for a roster spot under new head coach Kyle Shanahan, going up against George Kittle, Logan Paulsen, and Cole Hikutini. On September 2, 2017, the San Francisco 49ers waived Bell.

Minnesota Vikings

On September 3, 2017, Bell was claimed off waivers by the Minnesota Vikings. He began the season as the third tight end on the roster, behind Kyle Rudolph and David Morgan II.

Bell made his Minnesota Vikings' debut in their season-opening 29-19 victory over the New Orleans Saints. On October 1, 2017, he earned his first start with the Vikings and caught a 12-yard pass from quarterback Case Keenum during Minnesota's 14-7 loss to the Detroit Lions.

On December 10, 2017, Bell scored his first NFL points, catching a two-point conversion during a 31-24 loss against the Carolina Panthers. On December 15, 2017, the Minnesota Vikings placed Bell on injured/reserve after he suffered a shoulder injury.

On September 1, 2018, Bell was waived by the Vikings.

Jacksonville Jaguars
On October 16, 2018, he signed with the Jacksonville Jaguars. He appeared in 10 games (4 starts), tallying 8 receptions for 67 yards.

Kansas City Chiefs (first stint)
On April 2, 2019, Bell signed with the Kansas City Chiefs. Bell scored his first NFL touchdown on January 12, 2020 with an eight-yard touchdown reception in the fourth quarter of Kansas City’s AFC Divisional Playoff win over the Houston Texans. The Chiefs advanced to Super Bowl LIV where they defeated Bell’s former team San Francisco 49ers 31-20. Bell caught one pass for nine yards in the Super Bowl.

Dallas Cowboys
On April 7, 2020, Bell was signed as a free agent by the Dallas Cowboys, to take over the blocking tight end role that Jason Witten had the previous season. After starter Blake Jarwin was lost for the year with an ACL injury suffered in the season opener against the Los Angeles Rams, Bell became the backup tight end behind Dalton Schultz. He appeared in 16 games, making 11 receptions for 110 yards and no touchdowns. He started the seventh and eighth game, when the Cowboys employed a two tight end formation to provide extra passing protection.

Kansas City Chiefs (second stint)
On March 18, 2021, Bell signed with the Kansas City Chiefs. He was put on the Reserve/COVID-19 list on December 21, 2021. He was activated off the Reserve/COVID-19 list on December 24, 2021.

Bell re-signed with the Chiefs on March 24, 2022, to a one-year deal. Bell was placed on injured reserve on September 5, 2022. He was activated on December 23.

In the 2022 season, Bell recorded his first career receiving touchdown in the regular season in the Chiefs week 17 game against the Denver Broncos. Bell won his second Super Bowl ring when the Chiefs defeated the Eagles 38-35 in Super Bowl LVII.

Personal life
Bell is the son of former Seattle Seahawks and Indianapolis Colts player Mark Bell. His uncle, Mike Bell, played for the Kansas City Chiefs from 1979–91. Bell is a devout Roman Catholic.

References

External links
Oklahoma Sooners bio

1991 births
Living people
American football quarterbacks
Players of American football from Wichita, Kansas
American football tight ends
Oklahoma Sooners football players
San Francisco 49ers players
Minnesota Vikings players
Jacksonville Jaguars players
Kansas City Chiefs players
Dallas Cowboys players